Zapolnaya is a rural locality (a village) in Medvedevskoye Rural Settlement, Totemsky District, Vologda Oblast, Russia. The population was 2 as of 2002.

Geography 
Zapolnaya is located 20 km northeast of Totma (the district's administrative centre) by road. Lobanikha is the nearest rural locality.

References 

Rural localities in Tarnogsky District